The orange chromide (Pseudetroplus maculatus) is a species of cichlid fish that is endemic to freshwater and brackish streams, lagoons and estuaries in southern India and Sri Lanka. It is also known as pallathi (Malayalam: പള്ളത്തി) in Malayalam. The species is popular with fishkeeping hobbyists, and is kept frequently in aquariums. The species is part of the family Cichlidae and is included in subfamily Etroplinae.

Diet

The species co-occurs throughout its range with the green chromide (Etroplus suratensis). Orange chromides prey on the eggs and larvae of the green chromide and also act as a "cleaner fish" removing parasites from the larger green chromides in a cleaning symbiosis. The species also feeds on zooplankton and algae.

Parental care
Young orange chromides feed on mucous coating of their parents; this is essential for the small fry survival. During the feeding period, the parent fish mucous glands increase 34%.

References

External links

Orange chromide
Cichlid fish of Asia

Mucous feeding fish
Fish described in 1795
Taxa named by Marcus Elieser Bloch